The Gospel According to St. Matthew may refer to:

 Gospel of Matthew, one of the four Gospel accounts of the New Testament in the Bible
 The Gospel According to St. Matthew (film) (Italian: Il Vangelo secondo Matteo), a 1964 Italian film based on the Gospel, directed by Pier Paolo Pasolini